Giovanni Francesco (Giovanfrancesco) Lottini (1512 – August 1572 ) was an Italian politician and writer.

Lottini was born in Volterra in 1512. In 1530 he was accused of having seriously injured a fellow resident of Volterra and put on trial. He was secretary of Cosimo I, but in 1542 officially was removed by the same Cosimo I for acts of sodomy, but remained in his service for shady dealings. In February 1548 Cosimo I sent him to Venice, but it was he who prepared the plot against Lorenzino de' Medici, who oddly enough, the very same month, was hit by two killers from Volterra.

Away again from Florence, Lottini moved to Rome where he became secretary of the Cardinal of Santa Fiora. On January 31, 1550, during a conclave, Cardinal Niccolò Ridolfi was poisoned and many blamed Lottini.

In 1552 he obtained from Pope Marcellus II an appointment as canon of Abbey Hill of Piedmont.

In 1555 he entered the papal court, opposing the election of Pope Paul IV, who suffered much. On August 10 he was shut up in the Castel Sant'Angelo.

In 1559 he was at the service of Giovanni Angelo de'Medici as a secretary, who became Pope Pius IV and appointed Lottini Bishop of Conversano in 1560. Lottini however, refused the assignment, instead taking up his wandering life.

Before his death (in Rome, in August 1572) Lottini gave his brother a treatise of considerations and personal notes on different themes, from the military to the care of physical life. The manuscript entitled Avvedimenti Civili was given by his brother to Girolamo, the brother of Francesco I de' Medici, Grand Duke of Tuscany, in 1574.

External links

16th-century people of the Republic of Florence
1512 births
1572 deaths
Italian LGBT writers
16th-century Italian writers
16th-century male writers
16th-century LGBT people
16th-century Italian politicians